The Dhimar are a caste in India, sometimes referred to as a subcaste of boatmen.

Communities that are related to the Dhimar Kashyap Kashyap Rajput Mehra  live in Uttar Pradesh, haryana, Punjab, Madhya Pradesh, Maharashtra and Chhattisgarh include the Dhinwar, Dhewar , Jhimar,Jhinwar, Jhiwar, Kanshilya , Koshyal. There were proposals in 2013 that some or all of these communities in the state should be reclassified as Scheduled Castes under India's system of positive discrimination; this would have involved declassifying them from the Other Backwards Class category. Whether or not this would happen was a significant issue in the campaign for the 2014 Indian general election.

See also
Mallaah

References 
Citations

Bibliography

Further reading 

Fishing castes
Social groups of Uttar Pradesh